The Boone County Courthouse is a historic courthouse in Harrison, Arkansas.  It is a two-story brick structure, designed by noted Arkansas architect Charles L. Thompson and built in 1907.  It is Georgian Revival in style, with a hip roof above a course of dentil molding, and bands of cast stone that mark the floor levels of the building.  It has a projecting gabled entry section, three bays wide, with brick pilasters separating the center entrance from the flanking windows. The gable end has a dentillated pediment, and has a bullseye window at the center.

The building was listed on the National Register of Historic Places in 1976.

See also
Boone County Jail, also designed by Thompson and NRHP-listed in Harrison
National Register of Historic Places listings in Boone County, Arkansas

References

Courthouses on the National Register of Historic Places in Arkansas
Colonial Revival architecture in Arkansas
Government buildings completed in 1909
Buildings and structures in Harrison, Arkansas
National Register of Historic Places in Boone County, Arkansas
Historic district contributing properties in Arkansas
1909 establishments in Arkansas